The  or Sixty-nine Stations of the Kiso Road, is a series of ukiyo-e works created by Utagawa Hiroshige and Keisai Eisen. There are 71 total prints in the series (one for each of the 69 post stations and Nihonbashi; Nakatsugawa-juku has two prints). 

The common name for the Kiso Kaidō is "Nakasendō" so the series is sometimes referred to as the Sixty-nine Stations of the Nakasendō. It is a follow up to Hiroshige's The Fifty-three Stations of the Tōkaidō and he produced 47 of the prints, with Eisen being responsible for the rest.

The Nakasendō

The Nakasendō was one of the Five Routes constructed under Tokugawa Ieyasu, a series of roads linking the historical capital of Edo with the rest of Japan. The Nakasendō connected Edo with the then-capital of Kyoto. It was an alternate route to the Tōkaidō and travelled through the central part of Honshū, thus giving rise to its name, which means "Central Mountain Road". Along this road, there were sixty-nine different post stations, which provided stables, food, and lodging for travelers.

Prints by Eisen

Eisen produced the first 11 prints of the series, from Nihonbashi to Honjō-shuku, stretching from Tokyo to Saitama Prefecture. His prints from Gunma Prefecture include Kuragano-shuku, Itahana-shuku and Sakamoto-shuku. Representing Nagano Prefecture, he made prints of Kutsukake-shuku, Oiwake-shuku, Iwamurada-shuku, Shiojiri-shuku, Narai-juku, Yabuhara-juku, Nojiri-juku and Magome-juku. His last two prints, Unuma-juku and Gōdo-juku represent Gifu Prefecture. After that, Hiroshige took over production of the series.

Prints by Hiroshige

Hiroshige's prints start in Gunma Prefecture and include Shinmachi-shuku, Takasaki-shuku, Annaka-shuku and Matsuida-shuku. His prints that reflect Nagano Prefecture] are Karuisawa-shuku, Otai-shuku, from Shionada-juku to Shimosuwa-shuku, from Seba-juku to Niekawa-juku, from Miyanokoshi-juku to Suhara-juku, Midono-juku and Tsumago-juku. His prints from Gifu Prefecture include Ochiai-juku to Ōta-juku, Kanō-juku, and from Mieji-juku to Imasu-juku. His last ten prints, from Kashiwabara-juku to Ōtsu-juku are all in Shiga Prefecture.

Tabulation of series
The series consists of the sixty-nine stations of the Kiso Kaidō, plus a board for the starting point, the Nihonbashi bridge ("bridge of Japan") in Edo, and an additional print for the Nakatsugawa-juku station; a total of 71 prints, to which must be added the title page.

The series was published by publisher Takenouchi-Hōeidō, for the first part, and by publisher Kinjūdō for the second. Subsequent reissues were made by Kinjūdō.

See also
The Fifty-three Stations of the Tōkaidō by Hiroshige

References

Notes

 Matthi Forrer, Hiroshige. Prestel. 2011 (trans. Peter Mason) 
 Basil Stewart, A Guide to Japanese Prints and Their Subject Matter. Dover Books on Oriental Art, 1979 (1st ed. 1922), pp. 98–107.
 Gordon Friese, Keisai Eisen - Utagawa Hiroshige. Die 69 Stationen des Kisokaido: Eine vollständige Serie japanischer Farbholzschnitte und ihre Druckvarianten. Unna, 2008, 
 Sebastian Izzard, Hiroshige: Sixty-nine Stations of the Kisokaido.George Braziller, 2009.

External links
 The Sixty-nine Stations of the Kisokaido Road hiroshige.org.uk

69 stations
69 stations
Works by Keisai Eisen